The 2009 Sheraton Hawaii Bowl was the eighth edition of the college football bowl game, played at Aloha Stadium in Halawa, Hawaii. The game started at 3:00 pm local time (8:00 pm EST) on Thursday of Christmas Eve 2009, with the SMU Mustangs of Conference USA beating the Nevada Wolf Pack of the Western Athletic Conference, 45–10. The game was sponsored by Sheraton Hotels and Resorts and was televised on ESPN.

The 2009 Hawaii Bowl was SMU's first bowl bid since playing in Hawaii in the 1984 Aloha Bowl, as well as their first since the program was relaunched in 1989 after being shut down for two years due to massive NCAA rules violations. Head coach June Jones made his first appearance as a coach in Aloha Stadium since leaving Hawaii in 2008 to take over the SMU football program.

SMU freshman starter Kyle Padron, who was a backup until an injury earlier in the season to then starter Bo Levi Mitchell, was named the game's MVP after throwing for 460 yards and two touchdowns.

The two teams met for the first time since 2004 when they were both members of the WAC.  They previously played five times from 2000 to 2004, with Nevada having led the series with a 3–2 record.  Prior to this game, their last meeting was a 38–20 victory by SMU.

Game summary

Scoring summary

References

Hawaii Bowl
2009
2009
2009
Hawaii Bowl
2009 in sports in Hawaii